In functional analysis and related areas of mathematics, the group algebra is any of various constructions to assign to a locally compact group  an operator algebra (or more generally a Banach algebra), such that representations of the algebra are related to representations of the group.  As such, they are similar to the group ring associated to a discrete group.

The algebra Cc(G) of continuous functions with compact support
If G is a locally compact Hausdorff group, G carries an essentially unique left-invariant countably additive Borel measure μ called a Haar measure.  Using the Haar measure, one can define a convolution operation on the space Cc(G) of complex-valued continuous functions on G with compact support; Cc(G) can then be given any of various norms and the completion will be a group algebra.

To define the convolution operation, let f and g be two functions in Cc(G).  For t in G, define

The fact that  is continuous is immediate from the dominated convergence theorem. Also

where the dot stands for the product in G. Cc(G) also has a natural involution defined by:

where Δ is the modular function on G.  With this involution, it is a *-algebra.

Theorem. With the norm:

Cc(G) becomes an involutive normed algebra with an approximate identity.

The approximate identity can be indexed on a neighborhood basis of the identity consisting of compact sets.  Indeed, if V is a compact neighborhood of the identity, let fV be a non-negative continuous function supported in V such that

Then {fV}V is an approximate identity. A group algebra has an identity, as opposed to just an approximate identity, if and only if the topology on the group is the discrete topology.

Note that for discrete groups, Cc(G) is the same thing as the complex group ring C[G].

The importance of the group algebra is that it captures the unitary representation theory of G as shown in the following

Theorem. Let G be a locally compact group.  If U is a strongly continuous unitary representation of G on a Hilbert space H, then

 

is a non-degenerate bounded *-representation of the normed algebra Cc(G).  The map

 

is a bijection between the set of strongly continuous unitary representations of G and non-degenerate bounded *-representations of Cc(G).  This bijection respects unitary equivalence and strong containment. In particular, U is irreducible if and only if U is irreducible.

Non-degeneracy of a representation  of Cc(G) on a Hilbert space H  means that

is dense in H.

The convolution algebra L1(G) 
It is a standard theorem of measure theory that the completion of Cc(G) in the L1(G) norm is isomorphic to the space L1(G) of equivalence classes of functions which are integrable with respect to the Haar measure, where, as usual, two functions are regarded as equivalent if and only if they differ only on a set of Haar measure zero.

Theorem. L1(G) is a Banach *-algebra with the convolution product and involution defined above and with the L1 norm.  L1(G) also has a bounded approximate identity.

The group C*-algebra C*(G) 
Let  C[G] be the group ring of a discrete group G.

For a locally compact group G, the group C*-algebra C*(G) of G is defined to be the C*-enveloping algebra of L1(G), i.e. the completion of Cc(G) with respect to the largest C*-norm:

where  ranges over all non-degenerate *-representations of Cc(G) on Hilbert spaces. When G is discrete, it follows from the triangle inequality that, for any such , one has:

hence the norm is well-defined.

It follows from the definition that, when G is a discrete group, C*(G) has the following universal property: any *-homomorphism from C[G] to some  B(H) (the C*-algebra of bounded operators on some Hilbert space H) factors through the inclusion map:

The reduced group C*-algebra Cr*(G) 
The reduced group C*-algebra Cr*(G) is the completion of Cc(G) with respect to the norm

where

is the L2 norm.  Since the completion of Cc(G) with regard to the L2 norm is a Hilbert space, the Cr* norm is the norm of the bounded operator acting on L2(G) by convolution with f and thus a C*-norm.

Equivalently, Cr*(G) is the C*-algebra generated by the image of the left regular representation on ℓ2(G).

In general, Cr*(G) is a quotient of C*(G). The reduced group C*-algebra is isomorphic to the non-reduced group C*-algebra defined above if and only if G is amenable.

von Neumann algebras associated to groups 
The group von Neumann algebra W*(G) of G is the enveloping von Neumann algebra of C*(G).

For a discrete group G, we can consider the Hilbert space ℓ2(G) for which G is an orthonormal basis.  Since G operates on ℓ2(G) by permuting the basis vectors, we can identify the complex group ring C[G] with a subalgebra of the algebra of bounded operators on ℓ2(G).  The weak closure of this subalgebra, NG, is a von Neumann algebra.

The center of NG can be described in terms of those elements of G whose conjugacy class is finite.  In particular, if the identity element of G is the only group element with that property (that is, G has the infinite conjugacy class property), the center of NG consists only of complex multiples of the identity.

NG is isomorphic to the hyperfinite type II1 factor if and only if G is countable, amenable, and has the infinite conjugacy class property.

See also
 Graph algebra
 Incidence algebra
 Hecke algebra of a locally compact group
 Path algebra
 Groupoid algebra
 Stereotype algebra
 Stereotype group algebra
 Hopf algebra

Notes

References

 

Algebras
C*-algebras
von Neumann algebras
Unitary representation theory
Harmonic analysis
Lie groups